James Charles Carson (born July 20, 1968) is an American former professional hockey player. He played 10 seasons in the National Hockey League with five different teams. In 1988, he became only the second teenager in NHL history to score 50 goals in a season; the first was Wayne Gretzky.

Playing career
As a youth, Carson played in the 1980 and 1981 Quebec International Pee-Wee Hockey Tournaments with the Detroit Compuware minor ice hockey team.

Carson was drafted by the Los Angeles Kings in the 1986 NHL Entry Draft as the second overall pick. He scored 37 goals as an 18-year-old rookie in the 1986–87 NHL season. In just his second NHL season he notched 55 goals, establishing himself as one of the sport's top young players and setting a single season NHL record for most goals by a United States-born player. The record was matched by Kevin Stevens in the 1992–93 NHL season, QuantHockey Hockey Statistics.</ref> At the end of his second season, Carson was part of the August 9, 1988, blockbuster trade that sent himself, Martin Gélinas, the Kings' three first-round draft picks in 1989, 1991 and 1993, and $15 million cash to the Edmonton Oilers for Wayne Gretzky, Marty McSorley and Mike Krushelnyski.

Carson demanded a trade out of Edmonton in November 1989. He was traded to his hometown of Detroit along with Kevin McClelland and a fifth-round draft pick for Adam Graves, Petr Klíma, Joe Murphy and Jeff Sharples. These players were instrumental in helping Edmonton win their fifth Stanley Cup in seven years in 1990.

Carson later returned to Los Angeles in January 1993, following a trade for popular all-star defenseman Paul Coffey. He played with Gretzky and the Kings for parts of two seasons, but never regained the scoring touch he had early in his career. He later played for the Vancouver Canucks and the Hartford Whalers, where he ended his NHL career in 1996.

From 1996-1998 Carson played for his hometown Detroit Vipers of the International Hockey League. He was a member of the 1997 Turner Cup-winning team.

Carson represented the United States in the 1986 World Junior Ice Hockey Championships and the 1987 World Ice Hockey Championships.

Carson participated in the Red Wings versus Toronto Maple Leafs alumni game before the 2014 NHL Winter Classic at Comerica Park.

Personal life
Carson is of Greek descent; his grandfather changed the family name from Kyriazopoulos to Carson upon immigrating to the United States.

While still a player in the NHL, Carson began to prepare for a post-hockey career by earning certifications in financial planning in 1992. When his playing career ended, he joined Northwestern Mutual.

Carson and his wife have four children and reside in the Metro Detroit area. They have three sons and one daughter.

Achievements
Played in 1989 NHL All-Star Game.
Named to the NHL All-Rookie Team in 1987.
NHL single-season record for games played with 86, 1992–93 shared with Bob Kudelski who also played 86 games in 1993-94
Scored more goals as a teenager than any player in NHL history- 92 goals
Only Wayne Gretzky (20 years, 40 days old) scored 100 goals at a younger age than Jimmy Carson who achieved the feat at 20 years, 116 days old.

Career statistics

Regular season and playoffs

International

See also
List of NHL players with 100-point seasons

References

External links
 

1968 births
American men's ice hockey centers
American people of Greek descent
Detroit Red Wings players
Edmonton Oilers players
Hartford Whalers players
Ice hockey players from Michigan
Living people
Los Angeles Kings players
Detroit Vipers players
Los Angeles Kings draft picks
National Hockey League All-Stars
National Hockey League first-round draft picks
Sportspeople from Southfield, Michigan
Vancouver Canucks players
Verdun Junior Canadiens players